Hans Vanaken (born 24 August 1992) is a Belgian professional footballer who plays as an attacking midfielder for Belgian Pro League club Club Brugge and the Belgium national team. Vanaken is well known in Belgium for his prolific goal scoring ability despite playing in midfield.

Club career

Early career
Vanaken began his career at the youth team of Lommel United before leaving the club to join the PSV Eindhoven academy in 2002 when the former declared bankruptcy. He returned to a revamped Lommel in 2008 and made his senior debut for the club in the Belgian Second Division in 2010. He caught the eye of a number of top division clubs after a string of standout performances for Lommel and joined Lokeren in 2013.

He made top flight debut for Lokeren on 28 July 2013, when he scored two goals in a 3–2 win against defending champions Anderlecht. Vanaken was instrumental in Lokeren's run to the final of the 2013–14 Belgian Cup, playing in six of their seven matches and scoring one goal as his side edged out Zulte Waregem for the title. Vanaken further excelled in his second season in the top flight, scoring eight league goals and finishing third in the voting for the Belgian Golden Shoe award.

Club Brugge
It was announced in May 2015 that Lokeren had reached an agreement with Club Brugge over the transfer of Vanaken to the latter with the player signing a five-year deal subject to a medical. His maiden season at Club Brugge came with a spot in the starting line-up, where he proved instrumental in helping the club lift their 14th league championship.

In 2018, Vanaken scored 21 goals and provided a further 21 assists as he helped his team to its 15th league title and the Belgian Supercup. On 16 January 2019, Vanaken won the Belgian Golden Shoe award after having won the Belgian Professional Footballer of the Year award in May 2018.

Vanaken signed a new contract with Brugge on 9 August 2019, tying him to the club until 2024.

On 11 December 2019, Vanaken scored Brugge's equalizing goal in their Champions League home match against Spanish club Real Madrid; but Brugge would eventually fall to a 3–1 defeat and be parachuted into the UEFA Europa League Round of 32.

On 15 January 2020, Vanaken became the first player since Jan Ceulemans in 1986 to win back-to-back Belgian Golden Shoe awards. Vanaken won the award on the back of 20 goals and 7 assists during 2019.

On 20 May 2021, Vanaken scored twice as Brugge drew 3–3 with rivals Anderlecht to win the Belgian First Division A title for the fourth time in six years and 17th time overall. It was the first time since 1973 that Club Brugge had been crowned champions at Anderlecht's ground and the first time since 1976–77 and 1977–78 that Brugge had won back-to-back league titles.

International career
Vanaken made his debut for the Belgium national football team on 7 September 2018, replacing Eden Hazard in a 4–0 victory against Scotland at Hampden Park.

He scored his first two goals for Belgium on 30 March 2021, coming in an 8–0 win over Belarus in qualifying for the 2022 FIFA World Cup.

On 17 May 2021, Vanaken was one of two Belgium-based players to be selected for the final 26-man squad for the UEFA Euro 2020, along with club teammate Simon Mignolet.

Career statistics

Club

International

Scores and results list Belgium's goal tally first, score column indicates score after each Vanaken goal.

Honours
Lokeren
Belgian Cup: 2013–14

Club Brugge
Belgian First Division A: 2015–16, 2017–18, 2019–20, 2020–21, 2021–22
Belgian Super Cup: 2016, 2018, 2021, 2022

Individual
Belgian Professional Footballer of the Year: 2017–18, 2018–19
Belgian Golden Shoe: 2018, 2019

References

External links

Player profile at Club Brugge

1992 births
Living people
Association football midfielders
Belgian footballers
Belgium under-21 international footballers
Belgium youth international footballers
K.S.C. Lokeren Oost-Vlaanderen players
Lommel S.K. players
Club Brugge KV players
Belgian Pro League players
Challenger Pro League players
UEFA Euro 2020 players
2022 FIFA World Cup players
People from Neerpelt
Belgium international footballers
Footballers from Limburg (Belgium)